Robert Lindstedt and Aisam-ul-Haq Qureshi were the defending champions, but Lindstedt chose to compete in Eastbourne instead. Qureshi played alongside Jean-Julien Rojer, but lost in the first round to Roman Jebavý and Julio Peralta.

Marcelo Demoliner and Santiago González won the title, defeating Sander Arends and Matwé Middelkoop in the final, 7–5, 6–7(6–8), [10–8].

Seeds

Draw

Draw

References
 Main Draw

Antalya Open - Doubles
2018 Doubles